Litoribrevibacter albus is a Gram-negative, aerobic and short rod-shaped bacterium from the genus of Litoribrevibacter which has been isolated from coastal seawater from Xiamen in China.

References

Oceanospirillales
Bacteria described in 2015